Alka Lamba (born 21 September 1975) is an Indian politician serving for the Indian National Congress. After serving the Indian National Congress in various capacities for more than 20 years, she quit to join the Aam Aadmi Party on 26 December 2014. In February 2015, Lamba was elected to the Delhi Legislative Assembly from Chandni Chowk. She quit AAP in September 2019 citing disrespect for her within the party. On 6 September 2019, she formally returned to the Congress party. She was however disqualified from the Delhi assembly by Delhi speaker for violating the rules for party change over a gesture of strong warning to tainted turncoats.

Lamba began her career as a student leader, and is former President of Delhi University Students' Union, former National President of National Students' Union of India, former General Secretary of Delhi Pradesh Congress Committee and former Secretary of All India Congress Committee. She is Chairperson of the NGO Go India Foundation.

Early life 
Alka Lamba was born in New Delhi, India to Amar Nath Lamba, an Indian Army Civilian Engineer and Raj Kumari Lamba, a homemaker. She is one of six siblings.

Education 
Lamba completed her schooling at the Government Girls Senior Secondary School No.1, Delhi. Later she obtained her BSc degree from Dyal Singh College, Delhi (Delhi University) in 1996. Subsequently, she pursued her master's degree in Chemistry and Education from the Bundelkhand University, Uttar Pradesh.

Personal life 
Lamba married Lokesh Kapoor but the marriage did not last. They are currently divorced. They have a son named Hrithik Lamba.

Political career
Lamba was only 19 years old when she began her political career in 1994 as a second year B.Sc. student. She joined the National Students' Union of India (NSUI), the student wing of the Congress party and was promptly given the responsibility of being Delhi State Girl Convener. After one year in 1995, she contested the Delhi University Students' Union (DUSU) election for the post of President and won by a huge margin. In 1996, she worked as All India Girl Convener for NSUI, and in 1997 she was appointed the President of all India (NSUI).

In 2002, she was appointed the General Secretary of All India Mahila Congress. In 2003, she unsuccessfully contested Delhi Assembly elections from Moti Nagar Constituency against the senior BJP leader Madan Lal Khurana. In 2006 she became a member of All India Congress Committee (AICC) and was appointed General Secretary of Delhi Pradesh Congress Committee (DPCC). At the same time she was also appointed Vice Chairperson of National Institute of Public Cooperation and Child Development (NIPCCD), an autonomous body of Ministry of Women and Child Development, Government of India. She was a Secretary All India Congress Committee (AICC) at the Indian National Congress from 2007 to 2011. She left Indian National Congress in December 2014 to join Aam Aadmi Party. In February 2015, Lamba contested Delhi Legislative Assembly election from Chandni Chowk constituency on Aam Aadmi Party's ticket. She defeated her nearest rival, Suman Kumar Gupta of Bharatiya Janata Party, by a margin of 18,287 votes.

In September 2019, she quit the Aam Aadmi Party and rejoined the Indian National Congress party as she was disenchanted for quite some time with the AAP leadership. Lamba had openly disagreed with the AAP leadership regarding the passing of a resolution in December 2018 to revoke former prime minister Rajiv Gandhi's Bharat Ratna.

Lamba has visited the UK, Russia, the US, China, and Venezuela to attend seminars and give speeches about women's empowerment, human rights and sustainable development in third world nations. In 2005, she visited Venezuela to attend the World Festival of Youth and Students. In 2006, she visited the US to attend a conference on international women's leadership programs. In 2007 and 2008, she visited London to attend the UN's International Widows Day and tourism and cultural festival. In 2008–2009, Lamba visited Nepal to attend a seminar on disaster management programs. In 2010, Lamba travelled across Brunei, Singapore, Bangladesh, Sri Lanka, Malaysia, and Maldives with the 2010 Delhi Commonwealth Games Queen's Baton Relay.

Controversies
In August 2015, a few months after she had been elected MLA for the Chandni Chowk constituency, Lamba was charged with vandalism and destruction of property in an incident which occurred within her own constituency. On 10 August 2015, a mob armed with lathis, swagger sticks and cricket bats attacked and badly vandalized a liquor shop located in the Kashmere Gate area of old Delhi. CCTV footage recorded shows Lamba leading the attack and vandalising the shop along with her supporters. The footage shows her reaching straight for the shop counter and violently pushing and spilling and throwing away the items on the counter. Following this, her supporters also vandalised the shop. According to reports, this happened because the shopkeeper was a BJP supporter and had objected to the AAP defacing his shop windows with posters eulogising Lamba and her party.

Representing National Commission for Women on 16 July 2012, as one of the members of the enquiry team of 2012 Guwahati molestation case, Lamba met the victim of a Guwahati molestation case, held a press-conference and revealed the victim's identity. The 'tip-off' made local media houses work overtime to find the victim's real identity. Some TV channels interviewed the victim's neighbours to come to the conclusion that the girl's name was not what she was forced to say by the channel that recorded her molestation and near-stripping. Such acts of Lamba's were widely criticised. Following this, she was removed from the fact-finding committee of NCW.

Social work
A non-governmental organisation named Go India Foundation run by Alka Lamba got attention in 2010 during its blood donation campaigning. Significantly, over 65000 people donated blood in one day. The campaign was promoted by Salman Khan.

Elections contested

Delhi Legislative Assembly

References

 

1975 births
Living people
People from New Delhi
Women in Delhi politics
Women members of the Delhi Legislative Assembly
Delhi MLAs 2015–2020
Aam Aadmi Party MLAs from Delhi
Indian National Congress politicians from Delhi
Former members of Aam Aadmi Party from Delhi
Presidents of Delhi University Students Union
Delhi University alumni
Trade unionists from Delhi
Indian women trade unionists
Bundelkhand University alumni
21st-century Indian women politicians
21st-century Indian politicians